Freyne may refer to:

 Peter Freyne (1949–2009), American political journalist 
 Baron de Freyne, a title in the Peerage of the United Kingdom.